Jassim bin Saif bin Ahmed Al Sulaiti is the Qatari Minister of Transport. He was appointed as minister on 26 June 2013.

Education 
Al Sulaiti holds a Bachelor of Mechanical Engineering (1985) and a Master of Military Science (1997).

Career 
Prior to working as minister, Al Sulaiti served in the Qatar Armed Forces as Brigadier General and Commander of the Maintenance Arms. He is the chairman of Qatar Ports Management and QTerminals.

Honours 
Al Sulaiti was made Commander of the Legion of Honour in 2016.

References 

Living people
21st-century Qatari politicians
Qatari politicians
Government ministers of Qatar
Year of birth missing (living people)